Hels vite is the sixth studio album by Swedish viking metal band Thyrfing. It is the first album with new singer Jens Rydén, founding member of Naglfar.

Track listing 
 "En Sista Litania" – 07:10
 "Från Stormens Öga" – 08:07
 "Isolation" – 05:54
 "Hels Vite" – 08:28
 "Griftefrid" – 05:23
 "Becoming the Eye" – 07:54
 "Tre Vintrar – Två Solar" – 09:07

2008 albums
Thyrfing albums